Miacomet Golf Course is a public 18-hole golf course on Nantucket.

History 
In 1956, Ralph P. Marble, a Michigan-native, bought 400-acres of land on Nantucket with dairy farm intentions. The area he bought was called by the old Wampanoag inhabitants "Miacomet", which meant "The Meeting Place". Marble stated that he decided to build a golf course because the dairy market was not doing well.

In 1960, Marble began building the Miacomet Golf Course. In 1963, the Miacomet Golf Course opened as a public year-round golf course. In the early 1970s, due to a fire, the clubhouse was rebuilt without spending any money as the island community provided donated lumber and free labor to replace the original.

In 1983, Marble put the course up for sale and it was planned to be developed into a 216-lot subdivision. In 1985, the Nantucket Island Land Bank (Land Bank) worked with developers to negotiate the purchase of the Miacomet Golf Course for $4.5 million.

After this purchase, the Land Bank made a deal to lease the course operations back to the previous owners who still owned the clubhouse property. During the 1990s, the Land Bank was working on plans to expand this 9-hole course into a 18-hole course.

In 2003, the Lank Bank expanded the original 9-hole course into the only public 18-hole course on the island. It was at this point that the previous owners deeded the clubhouse property to the Land Bank in exchange for grandfathered-in course memberships.

Current operations 
Miacomet Golf Course is currently a public golf course with memberships capped at 400 members. The Land Bank currently contracts course management to Nantucket Golf Management (NGM), Inc, which is the same management team running the Siasconset Golf Club; one of the other golf courses on Nantucket.

During the 41st U.S. Mid-Amateur, Miacomet Golf Course was one of the stroke play co-hosts alongside other co-host Sankaty Head Golf Club.

Scorecard

*  BlueGolf

See also
 Siasconset Golf Club
 Sankaty Head Golf Club

References

External links 
When Did Golfing Begin on Nantucket?
Official Miacomet Golf Course Website
Official PGA Website for the Miacomet Golf Course

1963 establishments in Massachusetts
Buildings and structures in Nantucket, Massachusetts
Golf clubs and courses in Massachusetts
Sports venues completed in 1963
Tourist attractions in Nantucket, Massachusetts